Spialia is a genus of skippers in the family Hesperiidae, which are mainly found in Africa and Asia. They are commonly called grizzled skippers or sandmen.

As a result of genomic research published in 2020, 3 species of Spialia were moved to the new genus Agyllia and 14 species were moved to the new genus Ernsta.

Species
These species belong to the genus Spialia:
 Spialia ali Oberthür, 1881
 Spialia carnea (Reverdin, 1927)
 Spialia diomus (Hopffer, 1855) (common sandman)
 Spialia doris (Walker, 1870) (desert grizzled skipper)
 Spialia ferax (Wallengren, 1863) (ferax grizzled skipper)
 Spialia fetida Zhdanko, 1992
 Spialia galba (Fabricius, 1793) (indian skipper)
 Spialia geron (Watson, 1893)
 Spialia irida Zhdanko, 1993
 Spialia lugens (Staudinger, 1886)
 Spialia mafa (Trimen, 1870) (mafa sandman)
 Spialia orbifer (Hübner, 1823) (orbed red-underwing skipper)
 Spialia osthelderi (Pfeiffer, 1932)
 Spialia phlomidis (Herrich-Schäffer, 1845) (persian skipper)
 Spialia rosae Hernández-Roldán, Dapporto, Dinca, Vicente & Vila, 2016
 Spialia sertorius (Hoffmannsegg, 1804) (red-underwing skipper)
 Spialia spio (Linnaeus, 1764) (mountain sandman)
 Spialia struvei (Püngeler, 1914)
 Spialia therapne (Rambur, 1832) (corsican red-underwing skipper)

References

Natural History Museum Lepidoptera genus database
 
Seitz, A. Die Gross-Schmetterlinge der Erde 13: Die Afrikanischen Tagfalter. Plate XIII 75

External links
Images representing Spialia at Consortium for the Barcode of Life

 
Hesperiidae genera